The fifth Trophée d’Auvergne, was the fourth round of the 1964 FFSA Trophées de France. This was held on the Circuit de Charade, in the Auvergne mountains, near the town of Clermont-Ferrand, on 19 July.
This Formula Two race podium was a sign of things to come: Denny Hulme, Jackie Stewart and Jochen Rindt showed their skill before the track hosted the 1965 French Grand Prix.

Report

Entry
A total of 30 F2 cars were entered for the event, of which 22 took part in qualifying.

Qualifying

Race
The race was held over 32 laps of the Circuit de Charade. Denny Hulme took the winner's spoils for the works Brabham team, driving their Brabham-Cosworth BT10. Approximately 6.6s behind was the second place car, driven by Jackie Stewart, for Ron Harris - Lotus in their Cosworth-powered Lotus 32. The podium was completed by the second Brabham of Jochen Rindt.

Classification

Race Result

 Fastest lap: Richard Attwood, 3:40.9ecs. (81.569 mph)

References

1964 in motorsport
Trophées de France
Trophées d’Auvergne